National Trust of Queensland is a membership-based community organisation to "promote the natural, Indigenous and cultural heritage" of Queensland.  It was founded in 1963.

It is a member of the National Trust of Australia, which federates the eight autonomous National Trusts in each Australian state and territory.

The National Trust of Queensland is headquartered at Currumbin Wildlife Sanctuary, 28 Tomewin Street, Currumbin, Queensland on the Gold Coast. All members who manage the organisation do so on a voluntary basis.

The organisation conducts the National Trust of Queensland Heritage awards which were previously known as the John Herbert Memorial Awards.  The premier award is called the John Herbert Memorial Award in honour of a former president.

Heritage register 
The Heritage Register of the National Trust of Queensland contains buildings, precincts, natural environment places or culturally significant artefacts of Queensland.  Items on the Heritage Register are not protected by law.

Properties 
The Trust owns several properties on the register. 
 Brennan & Geraghtys Store, Maryborough
 Currumbin Wildlife Sanctuary, Gold Coast
 Hou Wang Temple, Atherton
 Moon's Reserve, Brookfield
 Cooktown Museum (formerly James Cook Historical Museum), Cooktown
 National Trust Heritage Centre, Townsville
 Royal Bull's Head Inn, Drayton (Toowoomba)
 Stock Exchange Arcade, Charters Towers
 Tent House, Mount Isa
 Wolston House at Wacol - the first to be acquired
 Zara Clark Museum (Charters Towers Museum), Charters Towers

See also 

 List of National Trust properties in Australia

References

External links 
 

Organisations based in Brisbane
National Trust of Queensland 
Historical societies of Australia
1963 establishments in Australia
Organizations established in 1963